Zhang Congzheng (1156–1228), courtesy name Zihe, was a Chinese physician and writer active during the Jin dynasty. Based in the capital city of Daliang (present-day Kaifeng, Henan), Zhang was known for his aggressive and unorthodox approach to medicine, which was based on the belief that all illnesses were caused by "deviant" qi. He is regarded as one of the "Four Great Masters" of the Jin-Yuan period.

Views and practices

General views
Controversially, Zhang attributed all sicknesses to "deviant" qi. Writing in Rumen shiqin, which was edited by his friend , Zhang recommends three methods for ridding the body of deviant qi, namely purging (for lower body qi), sweating (for "pathogenic" qi near the epidermis), and vomiting (for upper body blockages). Zhang also approved of acupuncture and moxibustion. However, he was cautious about the use of pharmaceuticals, as opposed to "dietary stratagems". While Zhang likely never met his contemporary Liu Wansu, he was influenced by his writings, particularly with regard to the treatment of "wind disorders".

Differentiated treatments
According to Li, Zhang's approach to medicine was more aggressive because he treated poor labourers who could "withstand his drastic purgatives". By contrast, Xue treated aristocrats whose bodies were comparatively weaker and therefore needed "restoratives" to strengthen their immune systems.

Zhang himself believed that patients from different parts of the country had to be treated differently: "Because the southern frontiers are hotter, it is appropriate to use bitter and cooling prescriptions to treat. The northern region is colder, so it is appropriate to use bitter and warming prescriptions to resolve." Elsewhere, he opined that those from the "central region" were most prone to spleen and stomach disorders because of their eating habits.

Childbirth
According to his case histories, Zhang treated a woman who was in mortal danger after her three midwives had exerted too much force on her, thereby killing the baby. He reportedly conducted an emergency delivery of the dead foetus using a makeshift device comprising a hook from a steelyard balance attached to a rope. In another case, Zhang diagnosed a married woman, who had for years dreamt of "intercourse with ghosts and deities", with an "overflow of yin" in the body which was preventing her from getting pregnant.

Insanity
Zhang is credited with being the first physician to theorise that insanity was caused by fire, heat, and mucus, and could be treated with emetics and laxatives, in addition to psychotherapy. Zhang noted, for instance, that people could develop mental illnesses after "(falling) off a horse" or "(dropping) into a well", because of "mucus-saliva that is acting up in the upper body" which could only be removed with therapeutic vomiting. In one recorded example, Zhang tied a "crazy" man, who had fallen off a horse, onto a rotating wheel; the "madness stopped completely" after the man vomited and had a few litres of cold water to drink.

Personal life and legacy
Born in 1156, Zhang was based in the capital city of Daliang (present-day Kaifeng, Henan). He was homeschooled from a young age. Because of his unorthodox approach to medicine, he did not interact much with his fellow physicians. Zhang died in 1228. 

In modern histories of medicine in China, Zhang is referred to as one of the Si dajia (literally "Four Great Masters") of the Jin-Yuan period, alongside , Liu Wansu, and Zhu Zhenheng. However, during the Ming and Qing dynasties, the "Four Great Masters" were understood to refer to Li, Liu, Zhu, and Zhang Ji (instead of Zhang Congzheng).

Notes

References

Citations

Works cited

 
 
 
 
 
 
 
 
 

1156 births
1228 deaths
12th-century Chinese physicians
12th-century Chinese writers
13th-century Chinese physicians
13th-century Chinese writers
Jin dynasty (1115–1234) people
Physicians from Hebei